Ark Kings Academy  is a co-educational all-through school and sixth form located over two sites in the Kings Norton area of Birmingham, West Midlands, England.

The school is funded by the Department for Education and operated by Ark Schools, a registered charity under English law and sponsored by parent charity Ark.

History

Secondary school (Shannon Road)
The Shannon Road site was established as Primrose Hill Senior School in 1967 and was renamed in 1993 as Kings Norton High School, to avoid confusion with nearby Primrose Hill Primary School.

In 2010, plans were announced to merge the school with Baverstock School to form a new 1,000-pupil school. Although a Statement of Intent was signed by Michael Gove, then Secretary of State for Education, this was later withdrawn.

The school converted to academy status in September 2012 and was renamed Ark Kings Academy. A sixth form provision was opened in September 2017.

Primary school (Tees Grove)
The Tees Grove site was originally established as Primrose Hill Primary School and was later renamed Primrose Hill Community School.

In September 2012 the school converted to academy status and was renamed Ark Rose Primary Academy. As both schools were part of the Ark Schools trust, in September 2017 Ark Rose Primary Academy formally merged with Ark Kings Academy, thereby sharing an amalgamated senior leadership and administration team.

Ofsted warning
In 2022, the school was given a funding warning after being found inadequate during an Ofsted inspection.
The Ofsted report, published in May 2022, following an inspection in February 2022, said: "Some pupils, particularly those who identify as LGBT, experience repeated name-calling and prejudiced behaviour. This means that pupils do not feel safe in the school."

GCSE results
The school has generally had low average percentage for 5+ GCSEs (or equivalent) A*-C incl. English & Maths in the past, with the lowest being 7% back in 2006. Since 2006 however, the average percentage has been either been going up or decreasing by 1% each year. However, before the school turned to an academy in September 2012, the school had a percentage of 41% for the final year as Kings Norton High, beating the previous record of 32% in 2010. However, for the first year of the academy in 2013, the school had a drop to 24% which had been the lowest in 4 years compared to 23% in 2009. This was also the lowest percentage compared to the rest of the ARK network. However, in 2015 Kings achieved 51% which was their highest results percentage ever recorded. This made Kings the most improved academy in the country over two years.

Notable former pupils
 Clive Wedderburn, Actor – Student (Primrose Hill Secondary School)
 Zoë Tyler, Singer – Student (Primrose Hill Secondary School)

Notable former staff
 Dene Cropper, Footballer – Teacher (Kings Norton High School/ARK Kings Academy)

References

External links

Secondary schools in Birmingham, West Midlands
Educational institutions established in 1967
1967 establishments in England
Academies in Birmingham, West Midlands
Kings Academy
Primary schools in Birmingham, West Midlands